Rozhkova is a rural locality in Nikolsky Selsoviet Rural Settlement, Oktyabrsky District, Kursk Oblast, Russia. Population:

Geography 
The village is located on the Rogozna River (a right tributary of the Seym River), 76 km from the Russia–Ukraine border, 25 km north-west of Kursk, 17 km north-west of the district center – the urban-type settlement Pryamitsyno, 4 km from the selsoviet center – Stoyanova.

 Climate
Rozhkova has a warm-summer humid continental climate (Dfb in the Köppen climate classification).

Transport 
Rozhkova is located 21 km from the federal route  Crimea Highway (a part of the European route ), 13.5 km from the road of regional importance  (Kursk – Lgov – Rylsk – border with Ukraine), 3 km from the road of intermunicipal significance  (Dyakonovo – Starkovo – Sokolovka), 2 km from the road  (38N-073 – Stoyanova), 15 km from the nearest railway halt 433 km (railway line Lgov I — Kursk).

The rural locality is situated 35 km from Kursk Vostochny Airport, 137 km from Belgorod International Airport and 238 km from Voronezh Peter the Great Airport.

References

Notes

Sources

Rural localities in Oktyabrsky District, Kursk Oblast